North Ravenswood is a neighborhood of Ravenswood in Jackson County, West Virginia, United States, and a former unincorporated community. It was formerly named Elford, and had its own post office.

References 

Neighborhoods in West Virginia
Populated places in Jackson County, West Virginia